Julian Kennedy (born July 23, 2002) is an American soccer player who currently plays for Wake Forest Demon Deacons.

Career 
Kennedy played with the Orlando City academy from 2015. He played as part of the club's USL League One side Orlando City B during their 2020 season, making his debut on August 1, 2020, starting against South Georgia Tormenta.

In December 2020, Kennedy committed to playing college soccer at Wake Forest University starting 2021.

References

External links 
 Julian Kennedy | Orlando City Soccer Club Orlando City bio

2002 births
American soccer players
Association football forwards
Living people
Orlando City B players
Soccer players from Orlando, Florida
USL League One players
Wake Forest Demon Deacons men's soccer players